Battle of Zhu Qissa, was a confrontation between the forces led by Tulayha and the forces of the Rashidun Caliphate.

Background
Abu Bakr received intelligence of the rebel movements, and immediately prepared for the defense of Medina. 

In July 632, As Usama's army was elsewhere, Abu Bakr scraped together a fighting force mainly from the Muhajireen and Ansar which consisted the earliest Muslim stalwarts like Ali ibn Abi Talib, Talha ibn Ubaidullah and Zubair ibn al-Awam. Each of them was appointed commander of one-third of the newly organised force. Before the apostates could do anything, Abu Bakr launched his army against their outposts and drove them back to Dhu Hussa.

Siege of Medina 
The siege of Medina was consisted of several phase.

A week or two after the departure of Usama's army, the rebel tribes surrounded Medina, knowing that there were few fighting forces in the city. Meanwhile, Tulayha, a self-proclaimed prophet, reinforced the rebels at Dhu Qissa. In the third week of July 632, the apostate army moved from Dhu Qissa to Dhu Hussa, from where they prepared to launch an attack on Medina.

The concentrations of rebels nearest Medina were located in two areas: Abraq, 72 miles to the north-east, and Dhu Qissa, 24 miles to the east. These concentrations consisted of the tribes of Banu Ghatafan, the Hawazin, and the Tayy. Abu Bakr sent envoys to all the enemy tribes, calling upon them to remain loyal to Islam and continue to pay their Zakat.

The following day, Abu Bakr marched from Medina with the main army and moved towards Dhu Hussa. As the riding camels were all with Usama's army, he could only muster inferior pack camels as mounts. These pack camels, being untrained for battle, bolted when Hibal, the apostate commander at Zhu Hussa, made a surprise attack from the hills; as a result, the Muslims retreated to Medina, and the apostates recaptured the outposts that they lost a few days earlier. At Medina, Abu Bakr reorganised the army for battle and attacked the apostates during the night, taking them by surprise. The apostates retreated from Dhu Hussa to Dhu Qissa. 

The Rashidun commanders held until they were reinforced by Abu Bakr. The following morning, Abu Bakr led his forces to Dhu Qissa, defeated the rebel tribes, capturing Dhu Qissa on 1 August 632.

Aftermath
Tulayha and his forces were driven back to Zhu Hussa.

The defeated apostate tribes retreated to Abraq, where more clansmen of the Ghatfan, the Hawazin, and the Tayy were gathered. Abu Bakr left a residual force under the command of An-Numan ibn Muqarrin at Dhu Qissa and returned with his main army to Medina. 

Later on, Tulayha gathered the forces again to fight the pursuing Muslim forces in the Battle of Buzakha.

See also
 Ridda Wars

References

Battles involving the Rashidun Caliphate
630s conflicts
632
630s in the Rashidun Caliphate

Primary sources
 History of the Prophets and Kings; Muhammad ibn Jarir al-Tabari
 Al-Bidaya wa'l-Nihaya; Abu al-Fiḍā ‘Imād Ad-Din Ismā‘īl Ibn Kathīr